Mitchell Scott Lyden (December 14, 1964), is an American former professional baseball player who played catcher in the Major League Baseball (MLB) in . He would play for the Florida Marlins. On June 16, 1993, he hit a home run in his first major league at bat, against the Chicago Cubs, on the second pitch. In his 6-game MLB career, he hit .300 (3-10) with 1 home run and 1 run batted in.

References

External links

Baseball Almanac

1964 births
Living people
Albany-Colonie Yankees players
American expatriate baseball players in Canada
Baseball coaches from Oregon
Baseball players from Portland, Oregon
Columbus Clippers players
Edmonton Trappers players
Elmira Pioneers players
Florida Marlins players
Fort Lauderdale Yankees players
Greensboro Hornets players
Gulf Coast Yankees players
Madison Black Wolf players
Major League Baseball catchers
Omaha Royals players
Oneonta Yankees players
Prince William Yankees players
Québec Capitales players
Taichung Agan players
Tidewater Tides players
Toledo Mud Hens players
Prince William Cannons players
American expatriate baseball players in Taiwan